Natsui (written: 夏井 or 夏居) is a Japanese surname. Notable people with the surname include:

, Japanese actress
, Japanese judoka

See also
, train station in Fukushima Prefecture, Japan

Japanese-language surnames